The 1988 Iowa Hawkeyes football team represented the University of Iowa in the 1988 NCAA Division I-A football season. The Hawkeyes played their home games at Kinnick Stadium and were led by legendary coach Hayden Fry. The 1988 season marked the 100th season of Iowa Hawkeyes football.

Schedule

Roster

Game summaries

Hawaii

After surrendering a 23-yard field goal by freshman Jason Elam with 1:36 left in the game, Iowa quickly drove to the Hawaii 20-yard line with 48 seconds remaining. A false start penalty pushed the Hawkeyes back five yards, then a devastating holding penalty wiped out a potential go-ahead touchdown from Chuck Hartlieb to Travis Watkins with 40 seconds left. After converting from the same distance midway through the 4th quarter, freshman kicker Jeff Skillett left a 44-yard field goal attempt short that would have tied the game with 17 seconds on the clock.

Kansas State

The Hawkeyes' 35-point victory extended the Wildcats' winless streak to 18 consecutive games. Iowa Offensive coordinator Bill Snyder was hired as Head coach at Kansas State following the regular season.

Colorado

Source: Box Score and Game Story

Colorado coach Bill McCartney indicated this win over the Hawkeyes was a major win for the Colorado football program. The Buffaloes finished the 1988 season with an 8-4 record before consecutive 11-win seasons in 1989 and 1990, the latter capped by an AP National Championship.

Iowa State

Source: Box Score and Game Story

The win over the Cyclones was the Hawkeyes sixth consecutive over their in-state rivals.

Michigan State

Source: Box Score and Game Story

Wisconsin

Source: Box Score and Game Story

Michigan

Source: Box Score and Game Story

A 17-17 tie at Kinnick Stadium was the lone blemish on an otherwise perfect Big Ten season for the Wolverines. After opening the season with consecutive losses, 19-17 at eventual National Champion Notre Dame and 31-30 at home to the team that finished #2 in the final polls, Miami (a game Michigan led 30-14 in the 4th quarter), Michigan went 9-0-1 the rest of the season including a Rose Bowl victory to finish with a #4 ranking.

Purdue

Source: Box Score and Game Story

Indiana

Source: Box Score and Game Story

Though Iowa finished only 4th in the final Big Ten standings, this was their lone conference loss. Chuck Hartlieb set the Iowa single game passing record with 558 yards through the air. Wide receiver Deven Harberts had 11 receptions for 233 yards and a touchdown.

Northwestern

Source: Box Score and Game Story

Ohio State

Source: Box Score and Game Story

Minnesota

Source: Box Score and Game Story

vs. NC State (Peach Bowl)

In a game played through a steady rain, the teams combined for 14 turnovers (7 each) and 12 fumbles (8 lost). NC State opened up a 28-3 second quarter lead by converting three Hawkeye fumbles into touchdowns. Iowa fought until the end behind Chuck Hartlieb's 428 passing yards.

Postseason awards
Marv Cook, Tight end – Consensus First-team All-American
Dave Haight, Defensive tackle – First-team All-American

Team players in the 1989 NFL Draft

References

Iowa
Iowa Hawkeyes football seasons
Iowa Hawkeyes football